Ranji or K. S. Ranjitsinhji (1872–1933) was a cricketer of the Victorian and Edwardian period.

Ranji may also refer to:
 Ranji Trophy, a domestic first-class cricket championship in India
 Ranji Bush or Acacia pyrifolia, a plant endemic to Australia

People with the given name
 Ranji Hordern (1883–1938), Australian cricketer
 Ranji Wilson (1886–1953), New Zealand rugby footballer
 Ranji Salgado (1929–2009), Sri Lankan economist, former Assistant Director of the International Monetary Fund
 Ranji H. Nagaswami, investment advisor to Michael Bloomberg, mayor of New York City